Dr. Kanailal Bhattacharya College, established in 1985, is an undergraduate college in Ramrajatala, Jagacha, (P.O. Santragachi), in Howrah district of West Bengal, India. It offers only courses in arts and commerce. It is affiliated with the University of Calcutta. The college was named after educationist and politician Dr. Kanailal Bhattacharyya.

Departments

Arts and Commerce and Science  

Bengali (Honours)
English (Honours)
History (Honours)
Geography (Honours)
Political Science (Honours)
Philosophy (Honours)
Education (Honours)
Commerce (Accountancy Honours)
Botany (Honours)
Physiology (Honours)
Zoology (Honours)
Food & Nutrition (B.Sc. General)
Journalism & Mass Communication (B.A. General)
B.A. (General)
B.Sc. (General)
B.Com. (General)

Accreditation
Dr. Kanailal Bhattacharya College is recognized by the University Grants Commission (UGC). It has been re-accredited and awarded B grade by the National Assessment and Accreditation Council (NAAC).

See also 
List of colleges affiliated to the University of Calcutta
Education in India
Education in West Bengal

References

External links
Dr. Kanailal Bhattacharya College

Universities and colleges in Howrah district
University of Calcutta affiliates
Educational institutions established in 1985
1985 establishments in West Bengal